Khanhuseyn Kazimli (in Azerbaijani: Xanhüseyn Kazımlı) is Member of Parliament (Milli Məclis) in Azerbaijan, the head of the working group on Azerbaijan-Hungary inter-parliamentary relations which was established on April 8, 2011.

References

Living people
Members of the National Assembly (Azerbaijan)
Year of birth missing (living people)